Francesco Appiani (January 29, 1704 – 1792) was an Italian painter of the late-Baroque period, active mainly in Rome and Perugia.

Biography
Appiani was born in Ancona.  He was a pupil of Domenico Simonetti, and then later moved to Rome to study under Francesco Trevisani, Francesco Mancini, and Giovanni Paolo Pannini.

He mainly worked in Perugia. Among his works, are a Death of San Domenico painted for the church of San Sisto Vecchio. He is known for his altarpiece in the Perugia Cathedral. He also painted lunettes for a church of a Benedictine convent dedicated to fallen women. In the chapel was an altarpiece by his contemporary Sebastiano Conca. The vault was frescoed by Cesare Sermei and the high altar had a painting by Matteo Salvucci. The church is today a political meeting hall.  He died in Perugia, aged about 88.

References

1704 births
1792 deaths
People from Perugia
Umbrian painters
18th-century Italian painters
Italian male painters
Italian Baroque painters
18th-century Italian male artists